A list of films released in Japan in 1959 (see 1959 in film).

See also
1959 in Japan

References

Footnotes

Sources

External links
Japanese films of 1959 at the Internet Movie Database

1959
Japanese
Films